= Renate Schimkoreit =

German diplomat

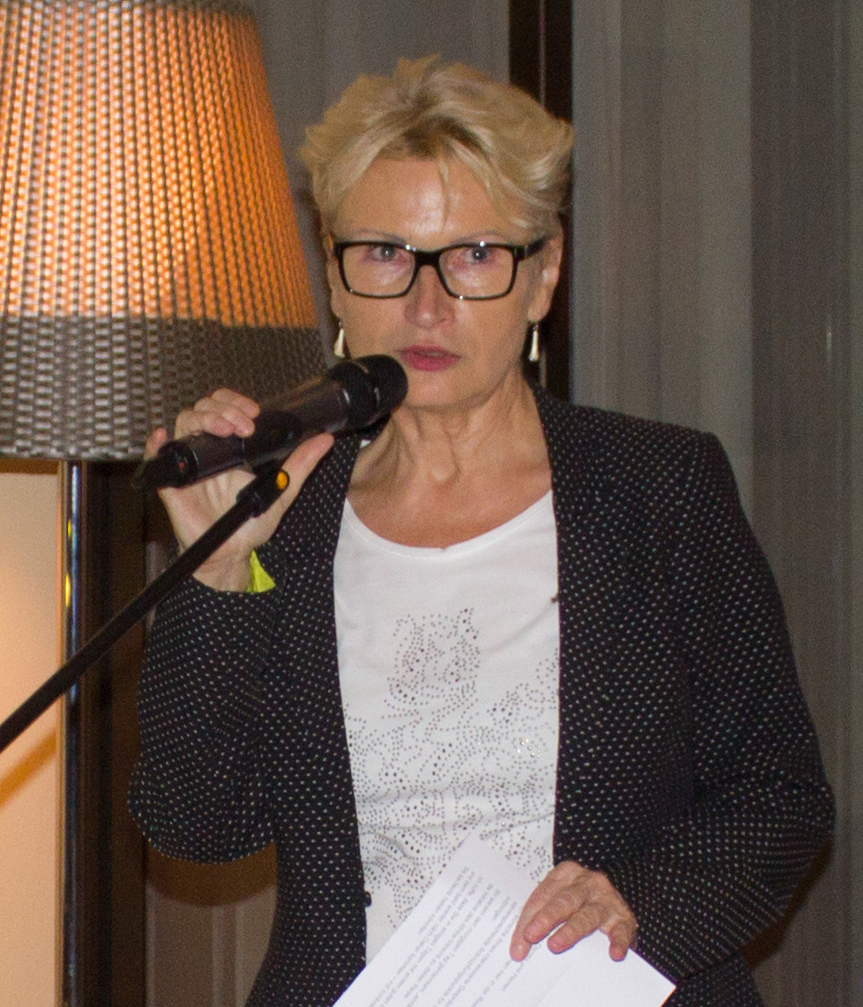
Renate Schimkoreit in 2016

Renate Schimkoreit (born October 18, 1954) is a German diplomat. She was ambassador of Germany to Ghana (2012–2014) and now ambassador of Germany to Senegal since 2016 till date.

== Background ==
Renate Schimkoreit began studying political science, economics and Islamic studies in 1973, graduating in 1979 with a master 's degree from the Albert Ludwig University in Freiburg.
